Taz Mania is the name of several video games based on the Taz-Mania cartoon series. A 2D side-scrolling platform/adventure video game developed by Recreational Brainware and published by Sega on the Sega Mega Drive/Genesis in 1992. Different games were also developed by NuFX and released on the Game Gear and by Technical Wave on the Master System. Other different Taz-Mania games were also published by Sunsoft and released on the SNES and 2 games on the Game Boy were made too. One from David A. Palmer Productions and published by Sunsoft and another from Beam Software and published by THQ.

Plot
The plot of the game was actually a twist on the usual "Save the World" story setting for many platform/adventure games. One evening, Hugh Tazmanian Devil was telling his three children (Taz, his sister Molly and his brother Jake) an intriguing tale: Once there were huge giant seabirds that laid giant eggs which could feed a family of Tazmanian devils for over a year. There are also legends that somewhere along the island of Tasmania, there is a Lost Valley, where the giant seabirds still nest. Taz becomes fascinated by the prospect of the potentially large omelet and leaves in search for one of those giant eggs. Thus, the player must direct Taz across various stages in search for the Lost Valley and its Giant Bird.

Gameplay
Players control Taz as he searches for the giant egg. Taz is able to jump, spin into a tornado and eat various objects. Spinning into a tornado allows Taz to defeat most enemies, as well as gain extra jump distance, knock away items and get past certain obstacles unharmed. Taz has the ability to eat most, if not all items throughout the level, such as health recovering food items, extra lives and continues. Eating some chilli peppers allows Taz to breathe fire in order to defeat stronger enemies, while eating a star grants Taz temporary invincibility. Other items, such as bombs and weed killer can be thrown at enemies, but will damage Taz if he eats them.

Development
Recreational Brainware was led by two programmers – Burt Sloane and Jonathan Miller and was based in San Francisco. A semi-sequel to this game in design and concept but unrelated to the Taz-Mania cartoon series was also developed and released by Sega on the same platforms in between 1994 and 1996, entitled Taz in Escape from Mars. An official sequel titled Taz-Mania 2 was planned with an isometric viewpoint, but was never put into development.

Reception

The Mega Drive version was a bestseller in the UK for 2 months. Mega placed the game at #19 in their Top Mega Drive Games of All Time. Mean Machines magazines gave the game an overall score of 81 out of 100 praising the graphics as "visually one of the most stunning megadrive games yet", also praising the game animation although there was criticism on the game difficulty as being too easy concluding "An enjoyable and visually exciting platform game which may not be tough enough for hardened platform veterans, but is still worth a look."

References

External links

1992 video games
Game Boy games
Master System games
NuFX games
Sega video games
Game Gear games
Sega Genesis games
Sunsoft games
Super Nintendo Entertainment System games
THQ games
Video games developed in Australia
Video games featuring the Tasmanian Devil (Looney Tunes)
Video games scored by Mark Cooksey
Video games set in Australia
Cartoon Network video games
Video games developed in Japan
Video games developed in the United States
Single-player video games